Taradas Bandyopadhyay (15 October 1947 – 18 July 2010) was a Bengali novelist, short story writer and editor.

Biography
Bandyopadhyay was the son of late legendary writer Bibhutibhushan Bandyopadhyay. He was born in 1947 at his maternal grandparent's home at Barrackpore, a suburb of Kolkata in North 24 Parganas and finished his schooling at the Rahara Ramakrishna Mission Boys' Home High School in Rahara. Bandyopadhyay passed B.A. (Honours) in English from Maulana Azad College and completed post-graduation from the Calcutta University. He worked in West Bengal government in the Information and Cultural Affairs Department. He spent his childhood at his paternal village-home in Bongaon in a place which was incidentally called Barakpur again.

Literary career
Taradas wrote number of short stories and novels like Kaal Nirabadhi, Saptarshir Alo, Kakkhopath. His novel Kajol was a sequel to Aparajito, written by his father. Taradas had started writing Kajol immediately after passing his Higher Secondary examination. Bandyopadhyay's most notable contribution was Taranath Tantrik, an occult practitioner. The character was created by Bibhutibhushan and continued by him. Those stories were published in two books namely Taranath Tantrik (1985) and Awlatchokro (2003). Bandyopadhyay also edited Aranyak. In the year 2008, Taradas started writing his interpretation of Bibhutibhusan's life in a biography-styled series called Pita Nohsi for Udbodhan magazine, but couldn't complete it because of his death in 2010.

Books
 Saptarshir Alo
 Kakkhopath
 Bandhu, Raho Raho
 Kaal Nirabodhi
 Kajol
 Tritiya Purush
 Awlatchakra
 Taranath Tantrik

References

External links
 

1947 births
2010 deaths
Bengali writers
Bengali-language writers
Indian male novelists
University of Calcutta alumni
Maulana Azad College alumni
People from North 24 Parganas district
People from West Bengal
21st-century Indian novelists
20th-century Indian novelists
Novelists from West Bengal
Bengali novelists
 Writers from Kolkata
Indian novelists
Bengali Hindus
20th-century Bengalis
21st-century Bengalis
20th-century Indian male writers
21st-century Indian male writers